Akwibong is a mountain in the county of Goesan, Chungcheongbuk-do in South Korea.

See also
List of mountains in Korea

Notes

References

Mountains of North Chungcheong Province
Goesan County
Mountains of South Korea